Mark Alexander Ballas Sr. (born December 25, 1960), known as Corky Ballas,  is an American retired competitive ballroom dancer who holds several Latin dance championship titles. His son, Mark Ballas, is a professional dancer on Dancing with the Stars. His father was George Ballas, who invented the Weed Eater lawn-trimming device.

Personal life
Ballas was born in Houston, Texas. He is the son of Mexican-American Maria Marulanda and Greek-American George Ballas, the inventor of the Weed Eater lawn-trimming device. His paternal grandparents, Karolos ("Charles") Ballas and Maria Lymnaos were immigrants to the United States from Greece. He has three sisters, Michelle, Maria, and Lillian, and one brother, George.

He has one son, Mark Ballas. Corky and Shirley Ballas also raised and trained Julianne Hough and Derek Hough.

Corky now teaches dancing in San Antonio via his dancing studio,  and his website. His plans for the future include more television performances as well as an online interactive dance instruction via hundreds of videos.

Career
Corky and Shirley were 1996 Open to the World International Champions, 1995–1996 Open to the World British Champions, twice British National Champions, Star - World Cup - UK - Champions, and seven times undefeated United States International Latin Champions.

Ballas judges professional competitions and teaches. He is based in Los Angeles, California and Houston, Texas.

Dancing with the Stars
Ballas has trained many of Dancing with the Stars' professionals including Karina Smirnoff, Julianne Hough, Derek Hough, Tony Dovolani, Edyta Sliwinska, Alec Mazo, Brian Fortuna, Jonathan Roberts, Anna Trebunskaya, Jessie DeSoto and, his son, Mark Ballas.

On August 25, 2008, the show's producers announced Corky himself would compete as a pro on season 7, alongside his son and former pupils. He was partnered with 82-year-old actress Cloris Leachman.

For Season 11 Ballas was partnered with Florence Henderson. They were eliminated in Week 5 of the competition.

Performances
With celebrity partner: Cloris Leachman

Score was awarded by stand in judge Michael Flatley.
With celebrity partner: Florence Henderson

See also
 U.S. National Dancesport Champions (Professional Latin)

References

External links

1960 births
Living people
American ballroom dancers
Entertainers from Houston
Participants in American reality television series
American people of Greek descent
American people of Mexican descent
St. Thomas High School (Houston, Texas) alumni
Ballas family